The dynasties of the United Arab Emirates consist of the six ruling families of the seven Emirates.

The Nahyan (branch of the House of Al Falahi) are the ruling family of Abu Dhabi.
The Maktoum (branch of the House of Al Falasi) are the ruling family of Dubai.
The Al Qasimi (also spelled Al Qassimi) families rule two of the seven emirates: Sharjah and Ras Al Khaimah.
The Al Nuaimi are the ruling family of Ajman.
The Al Mualla are the ruling family of Umm Al Quwain.
The Al Sharqi are the ruling family of Fujairah.

Nahyan dynasty — Abu Dhabi
 Sheikh Dhiyab bin Isa Al Nahyan (1761–1793) 
 Sheikh Shakhbut bin Dhiyab Al Nahyan (1793–1816)  
 Sheikh Muhammad bin Shakhbut Al Nahyan (1816–1818)  
 Sheikh Tahnun bin Shakhbut Al Nahyan (1818–1833)  
 Sheikh Khalifa bin Shakhbut Al Nahyan (1833–1845) 
 Sheikh Saeed bin Tahnun Al Nahyan (1845–1855) 
 Sheikh Zayed bin Khalifa Al Nahyan (1855–1909) 
 Sheikh Tahnun bin Zayed Al Nahyan (1909–1912)
 Sheikh Hamdan bin Zayed Al Nahyan (1912–1922) 
 Sheikh Sultan bin Zayed Al Nahyan (1922–1926)  
 Sheikh Saqr bin Zayed Al Nahyan (1926–1928)
 Sheikh Shakhbut bin Sultan Al Nahyan (1928–1966) 
 Sheikh Zayed bin Sultan Al Nahyan (1966–2004), founder of the United Arab Emirates
 Sheikh Khalifa bin Zayed Al Nahyan (2004–2022), President of UAE and Ruler of Abu Dhabi.
 Sheikh Mohammad bin Zayed Al Nahyan, President of UAE and Ruler of Abu Dhabi and Commander of UAE Armed Forces.
Sheikh Hamdan bin Zayed bin Sultan Al Nahyan Emir's Representative in the Western Region of Abu Dhabi.
 Sheikh Hamdan bin Mubarak Al Nahyan, Minister of Higher Education & Research Of Science.
 Sheikh Abdullah Bin Zayed Al Nahyan, Minister of Foreign Affairs.
 Sheikh Mansour bin Zayed Al Nahyan, Minister of Presidential Affairs.

Maktoum dynasty — Dubai

Late Sheikh Rashid bin Saeed Al Maktoum,  former ruler of Dubai
Emir Sheikh Mohammed bin Rashid Al Maktoum, Vice President and Prime Minister of UAE; Ruler of Dubai
Crown Prince Sheikh Hamdan bin Mohammed bin Rashid Al Maktoum, Crown Prince of Dubai
Deputy Ruler Sheikh Hamdan bin Rashid Al Maktoum, UAE Minister of Finance
Deputy Ruler Sheikh Maktoum bin Mohammed bin Rashid Al Maktoum
Sheikh Ahmed bin Saeed Al Maktoum, Emirates Airline chairman

Al Qasimi dynasty — Sharjah
 Sheikh Khalid bin Sultan Al Qasimi (1866 – 14 April 1868) 
 Sheikh Salim bin Sultan Al Qasimi (14 April 1868 – March 1883) 
 Sheikh Ibrahim bin Sultan Al Qasimi (1869–1871)  
 Sheikh Saqr bin Khalid Al Qasimi (March 1883–1914)
 Sheikh Khalid bin Ahmad Al Qasimi (13 April 1914 – 21 November 1924) 
 Sheikh Sultan bin Saqr Al Qasimi (1781-1866)
 Sheikh Sultan bin Saqr Al Qasimi II (21 November 1924–1951)
 Sheikh Mohammed bin Saqer Al Qasimi ( 1951 – May 1951) 
 Sheikh Saqr bin Sultan Al Qasimi (May 1951 – 24 June 1965), first time ruling 
 Sheikh Khalid bin Mohammed Al Qasimi (24 June 1965 – 24 January 1972) 
 Sheikh Saqr bin Sultan Al Qasimi (25 January 1972– 1972), second time ruling
 Sheikh Sultan bin Muhammad Al Qasimi (1972 – 17 June 1987)
 Sheikh Abdulaziz bin Mohammed Al-Qasimi (17–23 June 1987)  
 Sheikh Sultan bin Muhammad Al Qasimi (23 June 1987–present)

Al Qasimi dynasty — Ras Al Khaimah
 Sheikh Sultan bin Saqr Al Qasimi (1781–1866)
 Sheikh Ibrahim bin Sultan Al Qasimi (1866– May 1867)
 Sheikh Khalid bin Sultan Al Qasimi (May 1867 – 14 April 1868) 
 Sheikh Salim bin Ali Al Qasimi (14 April 1868 – 1869) 
 Sheikh Humaid bin Abdullah Al Qasimi (1869 – August 1900) 
 Sheikh Khalid bin Ahmad Al Qasimi (1914–1921) 
 Sheikh Sultan bin Salim Al Qasimi (19 July 1921 – February 1948)
 Sheikh Saqr bin Mohammad Al Qassimi (February 1948 – 27 October 2010) 
 Sheikh Saud bin Saqr Al Qasimi (27 October 2010–present)
 Sheikh Faisal bin Sultan Al Qasimi,  first Under Secretary of the Ministry of Defence 
 Sheikh Fahim bin Sultan Al Qasimi, former GCC general secretary and minister
 Sheikh Khalid bin Faisal bin Sultan Al Qassimi, Abu Dhabi Motorsport ambassador and world rally driver

Al Nuaimi dynasty — Ajman
 Sheikh Rashid bin Humaid Al Nuaimi (1816–1838)
 Sheikh Humaid bin Rashid Al Nuaimi (1838–1841)
 Sheikh Abdelaziz bin Rashid Al Nuaimi (1841–1848)
 Sheikh Humaid bin Rashid Al Nuaimi (1848–1864)
 Sheikh Rashid bin Humaid Al Nuaimi II (1864–1891)
 Sheikh Humaid bin Rashid Al Nuaimi II (1891–1900)
 Sheikh Abdulaziz bin Humaid Al Nuaimi (1900–1910)
 Sheikh Humaid bin Abdulaziz Al Nuaimi (1910–1928)
 Sheikh Rashid bin Humaid Al Nuaimi III (1928–1981)
 Sheikh Humaid bin Rashid Al Nuaimi III (1981–present)

Al Mualla dynasty — Umm Al Quwain
 Sheikh Rashid bin Majid Al Mualla (1768–1820)
 Sheikh Abdullah bin Rashid Al Mualla (1820–1853)
 Sheikh Ali bin Abdullah Al Mualla (1853–1873)
 Sheikh Ahmad bin Abdullah Al Mualla (1873–1904)
 Sheikh Rashid bin Ahmad Al Mualla (1904–1922)
 Sheikh Abdullah bin Rashid Al Mualla II (1922–1923)
 Sheikh Hamad bin Ibrahim Al Mualla (1923–1929)
 Sheikh Ahmad bin Rashid Al Mualla (1929–1981)
 Sheikh Rashid bin Ahmad Al Mualla II (1981–2009)
 Sheikh Saud bin Rashid Al Mualla (2009–present).
 Sheikh Abdullah bin Rashid Al Mualla III (Present Deputy Ruler).

Al Sharqi dynasty — Fujairah
 Sheikh Hamad bin Abdullah Al Sharqi
 Sheikh Saif bin Hamad Al Sharqi
 Sheikh Mohammed bin Hamad Al Sharqi (1908–1974)
 Sheikh Hamad bin Mohammed Al Sharqi (1975–present) 
 Sheikh Mohammed bin Hamad bin Mohammed Al Sharqi, Crown prince of Fujairah

References

Lists of Emirati people
Society of the United Arab Emirates
Middle Eastern royal families